David Chisnall (10 April 1948 – 11 January 2013) was an English professional rugby league footballer who played in the 1970s and 1980s.

Background
Chisnall was born in St. Helens, Englandwhen it was part of Lancashire countyin 1948. He is the younger brother of rugby league footballers Les and Eric Chisnall. All three Chisnalls played for the Leigh squad at times during their careers, with Dave and Les playing there together for at least one season. Chisnall died aged 64 in St Helens.

Playing career

International honours
Chisnall won caps for England while at Warrington in 1975 against Wales (interchange/substitute), in the 1975 Rugby League World Cup against France, Wales, and New Zealand, in 1975 against Papua New Guinea (non-test), and won caps for Great Britain while at Leigh in 1970 against Australia, and in the 1970 Rugby League World Cup against New Zealand.

Challenge Cup Final appearances
Chisnall played left-, in Warrington's 24–9 victory over Featherstone Rovers in the 1974 Challenge Cup Final during the 1973–74 season at Wembley Stadium, London on Saturday 11 May 1974, in front of a crowd of 77,400, and played left-, and was captain in the 7–14 defeat by Widnes in the 1975 Challenge Cup Final during the 1974–75 season at Wembley Stadium, London on Saturday 10 May 1975, in front of a crowd of 85,998.

County Cup Final appearances
Chisnall played left-, in Leigh's 2–11 defeat by Swinton in the 1969 Lancashire County Cup Final during the 1969–70 season at Central Park, Wigan on Saturday 1 November 1969, played left- in the 7–4 victory over St. Helens in the 1970 Lancashire County Cup Final during the 1970–71 season at Station Road, Swinton on Saturday 28 November 1970, and played as an interchange/substitute, (replacing  Tony Cooke) in Warrington's 16–0 victory over St. Helens in the 1982 Lancashire County Cup Final during the 1982–83 season at Central Park, Wigan on Saturday 23 October 1982.

BBC2 Floodlit Trophy Final appearances
Chisnall played left-, in Leigh's 11–6 victory over Wigan in the 1969 BBC2 Floodlit Trophy Final during the 1969–70 season at Central Park, Wigan on Tuesday 16 December 1969, played left- in Warrington's 0–0 draw with by Salford in the 1974 BBC2 Floodlit Trophy Final during the 1974–75 season at The Willows, Salford on Tuesday 17 December 1974, played left- in the 5–10 defeat by Salford in the 1974 BBC2 Floodlit Trophy Final replay during the 1974–75 season at Wilderspool Stadium, Warrington on Tuesday 28 January 1975, played left- in Leigh's 4–12 defeat by Castleford in the 1976 BBC2 Floodlit Trophy Final during the 1976–77 season at Hilton Park, Leigh on Tuesday 14 December 1976, played left- in St. Helens' 11–26 defeat by Hull Kingston Rovers in the 1977 BBC2 Floodlit Trophy Final during the 1977–78 season at Craven Park, Hull on Tuesday 13 December 1977, and played left-, and scored a try in the 7–13 defeat by Widnes in the 1978 BBC2 Floodlit Trophy Final during the 1978–79 season at Knowsley Road, St. Helens on Tuesday 12 December 1978.

Player's No.6/John Player Trophy Final appearances
Chisnall played left-, in Warrington's 27–16 victory over Rochdale Hornets in the 1973–74 Player's No.6 Trophy Final during the 1973–74 season at Central Park, Wigan on Saturday 9 February 1974, and played left- in Barrow's 5–12 defeat by Warrington in the 1980–81 John Player Trophy Final during the 1980–81 season at Central Park, Wigan on Saturday 24 January 1981.

Captain Morgan Trophy Final appearances
Chisnall played left-, in Warrington's 4–0 victory over Featherstone Rovers in the 1973–74 Captain Morgan Trophy Final during the 1973–74 season at The Willows, Salford on Saturday 26 January 1974, in front of a crowd of 5,259.

Club career
David Chisnall made his début for Warrington on Friday 20 August 1971, he was transferred from Warrington to Swinton in exchange for Brian Butler, and he played his last match for Warrington (in his second spell) on Monday 23 April 1984.

Honoured at Warrington Wolves
Dave Chisnall is a Warrington Wolves Hall of Fame inductee.

References

External links
Warrington's World Cup heroes – Dave Chisnall
(archived by web.archive.org) Back on the Wembley trail
Statistics at wolvesplayers.thisiswarrington.co.uk
Never be another like former Warrington Wolves prop Chissie
Profile at saints.org.uk

1948 births
2013 deaths
Barrow Raiders players
England national rugby league team players
English rugby league coaches
English rugby league players
Great Britain national rugby league team players
Leigh Leopards players
Liverpool City coaches
Rugby league players from St Helens, Merseyside
Rugby league props
St Helens R.F.C. players
Warrington Wolves captains
Warrington Wolves players